Anthony Myles (born June 16, 1992) is an American professional basketball player who currently plays for KW Titans of the NBL Canada.

Career
After playing high school basketball at Polytechnic High School (Woodside, Delaware). Myles played 4 seasons of college basketball at the Rider University, with the Rider Broncs.

Myles went undrafted in the 2014 NBA draft. In July 2014, he signed his first professional contract with Victoria Libertas Pesaro of Italy. After one season at Victoria Libertas Pesaro, he followed Peter Lorant and signed with Alba Fehérvár of the Hungarian National Championship.

On September 1, 2016, Myles signed with German club Tigers Tübingen for the 2016–17 season. On November 4, 2016, he parted ways with Tübingen after appearing in seven games. On December 19, 2016, he signed with Hungarian club Soproni KC for the rest of the season.

References

External links
Eurobasket.com Profile 
Italian League Profile  
RealGM.com Profile

1992 births
Living people
African-American basketball players
Alba Fehérvár players
American expatriate basketball people in Germany
American expatriate basketball people in Hungary
American expatriate basketball people in Italy
American men's basketball players
Basketball players from Delaware
People from Dover, Delaware
Rider Broncs men's basketball players
Soproni KC players
Victoria Libertas Pallacanestro players
Tigers Tübingen players
Guards (basketball)
21st-century African-American sportspeople